Billboard Top Rock'n'Roll Hits: 1970 is a compilation album released by Rhino Records in 1989, featuring 10 hit recordings from 1970.

All tracks on the album reached the top 5 on the Billboard Hot 100, with six of the songs going to No. 1 on the chart.

Track listing

Billboard Top Rock'n'Roll Hits albums
1989 compilation albums
Pop rock compilation albums